"Soldat" is a song by Malian-French singer Aya Nakamura. It was released on 13 September 2019. It peaked at number 6 in France.

Charts

Certifications

References

2019 singles
2019 songs
Aya Nakamura songs
French songs
Songs written by Aya Nakamura